Andrej Nastovski (born August 23, 2000) is a Macedonian professional basketball Point guard who currently plays for Crn Drim.

Professional career
On January 22, 2018, on his debut for MZT Skopje in ABA League he scored 3 points against Crvena zvezda in a 58:92 home lose. Two days later, he made his debut for MZT Skopje in Macedonian League scoring 16 points and 9 assists in a home win against Shkupi.

References

External links
 aba-liga.com
 fiba.com 
 realgm.com

2000 births
Living people
Macedonian men's basketball players
Sportspeople from Skopje
Point guards
KK MZT Skopje players